Devin Ray Robinson (born March 7, 1995) is an American basketball player for Baxi Manresa of the Liga ACB. He played college basketball for the University of Florida.

High School and College 
Robinson earned Virginia Prep League Player of the Year honors after averaging 24 points, ten rebounds, three blocked shots and two assists per game for Christchurch School in 2013–14 en route to a runner-up finish in the VISAA Division II State Championship.

He was recruited by Billy Donovan and chose the University of Florida over Connecticut, Indiana, Notre Dame and Oklahoma State. Despite being disappointed as Donovan left the Gators for the NBA prior to his sophomore year, Robinson stayed at Florida.

"Devin runs like a deer and gets his jump shot off so quickly (…) He’s a very talented guy. He can be a force at both ends of the floor", Florida head coach Michael White described his game in March 2017 according to richmondfreepress.com.

Robinson averaged 11.1 points and 6.1 rebounds a game in the 2016–17 campaign and then decided to forgo his senior year to launch his professional career and enter the 2017 NBA draft.

Professional career

Washington Wizards (2017–2019)
He went undrafted in the 2017 NBA draft, but joined the Washington Wizards for the 2017 NBA Summer League. Based on this performance, Robinson was signed to a two-way contract by the Wizards on July 14, 2017. He became the team's second two-way contract that year, meaning he also splits time between the Wizards and a G League that best suits Washington's area.  On November 2, 2017, Robinson was assigned to the Delaware 87ers of the NBA G League, and later in the season, to the Westchester Knicks.

Playing for the Wizards in the 2018 NBA Summer League, Robinson led the team in scoring with over 19 points per game.

On April 13, 2019, Robinson was arrested and charged with disorderly affray for an altercation with Jalen Mills of the Philadelphia Eagles, outside a DC nightclub. Robinson was taken to the hospital with injuries. Later in the day the Wizards said that they would not be extending Robinson's contract.

Robinson joined the Portland Trail Blazers for the 2019 Las Vegas Summer League.

Raptors 905 (2019–2020)
On July 23, 2019, the Toronto Raptors announced that they had signed Robinson. They released him on October 19, 2019. He was then added to the roster of their G League affiliate, Raptors 905. Robinson averaged 17.5 points, 7.3 rebounds, 1.9 assists, 1.1 steals, and 1 block per game, shooting 55% from the field.

Fort Wayne Mad Ants (2021)
On December 18, 2020, Robinson signed with the Indiana Pacers. On December 19, Robinson was waived by the Pacers and was later added to the roster of their G League affiliate, the Fort Wayne Mad Ants.

Taoyuan Pilots (2021–2022)
On November 10, 2021, Robinson has signed with Taoyuan Pilots of the P. League+.

ratiopharm Ulm (2022)
On September 20, 2022, he signed with ratiopharm Ulm of the German Basketball Bundesliga.

Bàsquet Manresa (2022–present)
On December 12, 2022, he signed with Baxi Manresa of the Liga ACB.

Career statistics

NBA

Regular season

|-
| style="text-align:left;"| 
| style="text-align:left;"| Washington
| 1 || 0 || 13.0 || .333 || – || – || 5.0 || .0 || 1.0 || .0 || 2.0
|-
| style="text-align:left;"| 
| style="text-align:left;"| Washington
| 7 || 0 || 13.6 || .594 || .000 || .643 || 2.9 || .9 || .6 || .9 || 6.7
|- class="sortbottom"
| style="text-align:center;" colspan="2"| Career
| 8 || 0 || 13.5 || .571 || .000 || .643 || 3.1 || .8 || .6 || .8 || 6.1

College

|-
| style="text-align:left;"| 2014–15
| style="text-align:left;"| Florida
| 33 || 18 || 19.0 || .402 || .256 || .636 || 2.8 || .7 || .5 || .4 || 6.4
|-
| style="text-align:left;"| 2015–16
| style="text-align:left;"| Florida
| 36 || 18 || 23.1 || .458 || .340 || .756 || 5.6 || .5 || .5 || .6 || 9.0
|-
| style="text-align:left;"| 2016–17
| style="text-align:left;"| Florida
| 36 || 35 || 26.4 || .475 || .391 || .723 || 6.1 || .6 || .9 || .8 || 11.1
|- class="sortbottom"
| style="text-align:center;" colspan="2"| Career
| 105 || 71 || 23.0 || .450 || .336 || .714 || 4.9 || .6 || .6 || .6 || 8.9

References

External links 
 Florida Gators bio
 Profile at eurobasket.com

1995 births
Living people
21st-century African-American sportspeople
African-American basketball players
American expatriate basketball people in Canada
American expatriate basketball people in Taiwan
American men's basketball players
Basketball players from Virginia
Bàsquet Manresa players
Capital City Go-Go players
Delaware 87ers players
Florida Gators men's basketball players
Fort Wayne Mad Ants players
P. League+ imports
Parade High School All-Americans (boys' basketball)
People from Chesterfield, Virginia
Power forwards (basketball)
Raptors 905 players
Ratiopharm Ulm players
Taoyuan Pilots players
Undrafted National Basketball Association players
Washington Wizards players
Westchester Knicks players